Khan Mohammad Azad (also known as KM Azad; born 15 October 1974) is a Bangladesh Army colonel who served as the Additional Director General (Operations) at the Rapid Action Battalion (RAB) - the elite multi-service, anti-crime and anti-terrorism unit of the Bangladesh Police.

Career 
Azad joined the Bangladesh Army in 1995 with 32nd BMA long course. In March 2009, he was appointed as a deputy director of RAB - a position he held until January 2012. In January 2012, Azad was appointed as Military Observer (MILOB) with the United Nations Organization Stabilization Mission in the Democratic Republic of the Congo (MONUSCO).

He received his commission from the Infantry Division of the Bangladesh Army through the Bangladesh Military Academy (BMA) Long Course. He worked as the Battalion Commander at the Bangladesh Infantry Regimental Centre (BIR), in the position of Colonel. Earlier in his career, he had served as Operation Wing Director at RAB headquarters at Kurmitola and Commanding Officer of the RAB-7 field unit in Chattogram.

Azad re-joined RAB on deputation from the Bangladesh Army on 9 March 2021. He was subsequently appointed Additional Director General (Operations) of RAB on 16 March 2021, replacing Colonel Tofayel Mustafa Sorwar.

U.S. sanctions 
On 10 December 2021, the U.S. Department of the Treasury added Azad to its Specially Designated Nationals (SDN) list under the Global Magnistsky Act for engaging in serious human rights abuses relating to his tenure at RAB.

References 

1974 births
Living people
Bangladesh Army colonels
Bangladesh Army officers
Specially Designated Nationals and Blocked Persons List
Rapid Action Battalion officers
People sanctioned under the Magnitsky Act
People from Barisal District